Comedy Night with Rick Mercer is a Canadian television comedy series, which premiered on CBC Television in September 2022. Hosted by Rick Mercer and produced by Just for Laughs, the series consists of stand-up comedy performances by Canadian comedians recorded in various locations across the country on a national comedy tour.

Episodes

References

External links

2022 Canadian television series debuts
2020s Canadian comedy television series
Canadian stand-up comedy television series
CBC Television original programming